is a Buddhist temple in the town of Kudoyama that marks the entrance to the pilgrimage route of Koyasan. It is part of the "Sacred Sites and Pilgrimage Routes in the Kii Mountain Range" UNESCO World Heritage Site.

The Koyasan complex includes

 Kongobu-ji, built by Kūkai in 816 as the principal stage for esoteric Buddhism on an 800m high mountain basin,
 Jison-in, built as an administrative office to facilitate the construction and management of Kongobu-ji,
 Niukanshofu Jinja,  constructed as a guardian shrine to protect the Niukanshofu estate of Kongobu-ji, and
 Niutsuhime Jinja, situated in the Amano basin between Kongobu-ji and Jison-in. Closely connected to Koyasan, it enshrines Koya Myōjin who, legend tells, gave land to Kūkai when he choose the compound of Kongobu-ji, and Niu Myōjin, who guided him, and all of them are connected by the pilgrimage route Koyasan Choishimichi.

See also
List of National Treasures of Japan (sculptures)

Sources

Sacred Sites and Pilgrimage Routes in the Kii Mountain Range 

Buddhist temples in Wakayama Prefecture
World Heritage Sites in Japan
Important Cultural Properties of Japan
Historic Sites of Japan
Kōyasan Shingon temples